Rains Brook is a  tributary of the River Leam.

Formed by a series of small headwater streams midway between Barby and Kilsby in Northamptonshire, it then flows west in a valley south of Rugby on the border between Northamptonshire and Warwickshire. It then runs south-west to where it joins the River Leam, between Kites Hardwick and Woolscott.

See also
List of rivers of England

References

Rivers of Northamptonshire
Rivers of Warwickshire
2Rains